Henwood is a hamlet in the civil parish of Linkinhorne in east Cornwall, England. Henwood is on the edge of Bodmin Moor and situated between Stowe Hill (southwest) and Notter Tor (northeast).

References

Hamlets in Cornwall